Helga Halldórsdóttir (born 22 April 1963) is an Icelandic hurdler. She competed in the women's 400 metres hurdles at the 1988 Summer Olympics.

References

1963 births
Living people
Athletes (track and field) at the 1988 Summer Olympics
Helga Halldorsdottir
Helga Halldorsdottir
World Athletics Championships athletes for Iceland
Place of birth missing (living people)